Ryan Buendia, also known as DJ Replay, is an American DJ, turntablist, producer, and songwriter.

Songwriting credits

References

Living people
American musicians of Filipino descent
American male songwriters
American record producers
American DJs
Year of birth missing (living people)